Stories about Ming Dynasty is a novel gathering internet-posted messages about the Ming Dynasty by Dangnian Mingyue (当年明月) whose real name is Shi Yue (石悅). The novel is the first edited novel from a standard history.

Background  
It was first posted on the internet forum Tianya Club by Dangnian Mingyue on March 10, 2006. The post started with the first emperor of the Ming dynasty Zhu Yuanzhang and continued with the posting of the short period after the first emperor. As Dangnian Mingyue was posting the standard history novel online, his posts received numerous clicks and he was met with a lot of positive feedback. Dangnian Mingyue followed the advice of some of his fans to gather his posts and publish them in a book.

By March 21, 2009, Dangnian Mingyue finished posting the last chapter about the Chongzhen Emperor. Before this book was pubublished, there had been no standard history novel like this one in existence. Most of the historical novels before it tended to be more fictions and held little truth.

Awards 
The book has sold over 5 million copies. It was the best selling book in 2007-2008 and received awards.

References 

2006 Chinese novels
Chinese historical novels
Novels set in the Ming dynasty